William Arnold may refer to:

Military
William Richard Arnold (bishop) (1881–1965), U.S. Army Chief of Chaplains
William Howard Arnold (1901–1976), U.S. Army general

Politicians
William Munnings Arnold (1819–1875), politician and speaker of the New South Wales Legislative Assembly
William Carlile Arnold (1851–1906), U.S. Representative from Pennsylvania
William W. Arnold (1877–1957), U.S. Representative from Illinois
William Arnold (bailiff) (1903–1973), Bailiff of Guernsey

Sports
William Arnold (footballer) (1900–1977), English footballer
Willie Arnold (1881–1957), Welsh rugby international player

Others
William Arnold (settler) (1587–1676), founding settler in Rhode Island
William Arnold (architect) (fl. 1595–1637), master mason in Somerset, England
William Delafield Arnold (1828–1859), British author and colonial administrator
William W. Arnold (ornithologist) (1843–1923), American physician and ornithologist
William Thomas Arnold (1852–1904), English writer and journalist
William Howard Arnold (physicist) (fl. 1955–2004), American nuclear physicist

See also
RNLB Sir William Arnold (ON 1025), former RNLI lifeboat in Guernsey
Bill Arnold (disambiguation)
Billy Arnold (disambiguation)